Taiyafeh-ye Shaeran (also Romanized as Ţāīyafeh-ye Shā‘erān; also known as Shā‘erān and Shā‘erān-e Cheleh) is a village in Cheleh Rural District, in the Central District of Gilan-e Gharb County, Kermanshah Province, Iran. At the 2006 census, its population was 161, in 32 families.

References 

Populated places in Gilan-e Gharb County